The following lists events that happened during 1990 in Chile.

Incumbents
President of Chile: Augusto Pinochet (until 11 March), Patricio Aylwin (starting 11 March).

Events

February 
 February 18 :

A bus from the Ramos Cholele company collides with a truck near Taltal, leaving 22 dead and 30 injured.

 The shipwreck of the fishing boat "Calypso I" that transported members of the amateur football club "Barrio Miraflores" in the bay of Corral, near Valdivia, takes place. Leaving 21 deceased.

March
 March 8 – Admiral José Toribio Merino accepts his resignation as the Commander in Chief of the Chilean Navy.

 March 10 – The Organic Constitutional Law on Education was published for the first time.

 March 11 – Patricio Aylwin assumes as President, marks the end of the 17 year dictatorial of Augusto Pinochet.

 March 21 – In an attack initially attributed to the Manuel Rodríguez Patriotic Front , the former Commander-in-Chief of the Air Force, Gustavo Leigh , suffers serious injuries and loses an eye, but survives.

31 March – Death of Jonathan Moyle

May
31 May – The Pisagua case begins.

July
 19 July – The political party Union of the Centrist Center is founded.

December
 7 & 8 December – The 1990 Chilean telethon takes place.

Sport

 Chile national football team 1990
 1990 Copa Apertura

Births
2 January – Ignacio Hasbún
9 August – Sebastián Ubilla

Deaths
31 May – Clotario Blest

References 

 
Years of the 20th century in Chile
Chile